Olaine Parish is an administrative unit of Olaine Municipality, Latvia. The territory of Olaine Parish is defined by Latvian law as belonging partly to the Vidzeme region and partly to Semigallia.

Towns, villages and settlements of Olaine parish

References

Parishes of Latvia
Olaine Municipality
Vidzeme
Semigallia